The Varangian Way is the second full-length album by the Finnish folk metal band Turisas, released on May 27, 2007 through Century Media.  It is a concept album that tells the story of a group of Scandinavians traveling the river routes of medieval Kievan Rus' (territory of modern Belarus, Ukraine and Russia), through Ladoga, Novgorod and Kyiv, down to the Eastern Roman Empire.

A Special "Directors Cut" edition was released with the Rasputin single.

Track listing
 "To Holmgard and Beyond" – 5:17
 "A Portage to the Unknown" – 4:50
 "Cursed Be Iron" – 5:03
 "Fields of Gold" – 4:34
 "In the Court of Jarisleif" – 3:17
 "Five Hundred and One" – 6:18
 "The Dnieper Rapids" – 5:20
 "Miklagard Overture" – 8:18
 "Rasputin" (Boney M. cover) (Director's Cut bonus track) - 3:53
 "To Holmgard and Beyond" [Single Edit] (Enhanced edition bonus track) - 3:00
 "Rex Regi Rebellis" [Finnish Version with Prologue] (Enhanced edition bonus track) - 10:20
 "Battle Metal" Live at Party San '06 (Enhanced edition bonus track) - 5:40

A Limited Edition "Pagan Fest Tour Edition" version comes with two bonus tracks, Rasputin and To Holmgard and Beyond (single edit), and a DVD containing the video for Rasputin and several live performances.

Credits
Mathias "Warlord" Nygård – vocals, orchestral programming, keyboard
Jussi Wickström – guitar
Tuomas "Tude" Lehtonen – drums, percussion
Olli Vänskä – violin
Hannes "Hanu" Horma – bass, backing vocals
Janne "Lisko" Mäkinen – accordion
Music by Mathias Nygård, except track 3 (Nygård/Wickström), 5 (Nygård/Lisko/Vänskä) and 6 (Nygård/Vänskä).
Lyrics by Mathias Nygård, except track 3 (traditional/Elias Lönnrot), taken from the Finnish national epic, the Kalevala.
Classical choir recorded at Vanha Kirjastotalo Music Hall, Tampere, Finland.
Orchestral samples included in this recording from the Vienna Symphonic Library.

Sources
 Century Media press statement
 Turisas studio diary
 Turisas official website

References

See also

 Trade route from the Varangians to the Greeks
 The Long Ships (historical novel dealing with the same subject)
 Kalevala (the lyrics of "Cursed Be Iron" contain a section of the poem "The Origin of Iron")

Turisas albums
Concept albums
2007 albums
Century Media Records albums